Tymoteusz "Timothee" Adamowski (March 24, 1858April 18, 1943) was a Polish-born American conductor, composer, and violinist. Born in Warsaw, he studied in that city's conservatory, later moving on to further studies in Paris. He served as the first conductor of the Boston Pops Orchestra. Tymoteusz was the uncle of Polish Olympic hockey player Tadeusz Adamowski and the humanitarian Helenka Adamowska Pantaleoni.

Early life
Timothee Adamowski was born in Warsaw in 1858. His father, Wincenty Adamowski, was an artist and music lover, who worked as a civil engineer and an administrator, and settled in Warsaw to a life of public philanthropy. He was also a good friend of Ignacy Jan Paderewski, who placed a wreath on his grave.

Career
Timothee began instruction in violin at the age of 7. He later studied at the Warsaw Conservatory under Apolinary Kątski and at the Paris Conservatory under Lambert Massart. Upon his arrival in America he traveled as soloist with Maurice Strakosch and Clara Louise Kellogg; with his own troupe he played in a number of larger cities as well. "From 1884 to 1908, with the exception of 1887 when he travelled in Europe, he was a member of the Boston Symphony Orchestra, which was founded in 1881". He served as the concertmaster of the Boston Symphony Orchestra from 1884 to 1908.

In 1888 he organized the Adamowski String Quartet in Boston. Timothee was first violinist, Emmanuel Fiedler was second violinist, Daniel Kuntz was violist, and Giuseppe Campanari was cellist. The quartet was reformed in 1890, with Arnold Moldauer, Max Zach, and Josef Adamowski replacing the other three artists. In 1896, "the Adamowski Trio consisted of Timothee Adamowski, violin, Josef Adamowski, cello, and Antoinette [Antonina] Adamowska, piano".

Adamowski led the Boston Pops Orchestra from 1890 until 1894, serving as its first conductor. "[W]hen Timothee Adamowski conducted the Boston Symphony Orchestra in popular summer concerts, he was referred to in newspaper accounts as the 'Idol of the Pops'".

He also taught at the New England Conservatory of Music from 1885 until 1886, where his students included composer and violinist Elise Fellows White. He joined the faculty in 1907, remaining there until 1933. He also traveled frequently to Paris and London, and conducted in Warsaw as well. Some of his songs were published.

Personal life
Adamowski married Gertrude Lewis Pancoast of Philadelphia in 1903. He died aged 86 in 1943, in Boston, and is buried in West Laurel Hill Cemetery, Bala Cynwyd, Montgomery County, Pennsylvania.

References

1858 births
1943 deaths
People from Warsaw Governorate
American classical violinists
Male classical violinists
American male violinists
American conductors (music)
American male conductors (music)
American male classical composers
American classical composers
Burials at West Laurel Hill Cemetery
Polish classical composers
Polish male classical composers
Polish classical violinists
Polish conductors (music)
Male conductors (music)
Congress Poland emigrants to the United States